Hylettus spilotus is a species of longhorn beetles of the subfamily Lamiinae. It was described by Monné in 1982, and is known from eastern Ecuador, Peru, eastern central Brazil, and French Guiana.

References

Beetles described in 1982
Beetles of South America
Hylettus